The following is a list of ministers of the Ministry of Agriculture and Land Reclamation of Egypt.

List

Monarchical era (1873–1952)

Republican era (1952–present)

See also
Cabinet of Egypt

References

 
Agriculture